Independent School District 196 is a K-12 public school district located in the south suburban Twin Cities, near both Minneapolis and St. Paul in Minnesota.

Also known as the Rosemount-Apple Valley-Eagan School District, District 196 serves approximately 28,300 students in grades Early Childhood-12 and is Minnesota's fourth largest school district. The  district boundary includes all or part of seven cities - Rosemount, Apple Valley, Eagan, Burnsville, Coates, Inver Grove Heights and Lakeville - and rural Empire and Vermillion townships.

District 196 has 19 elementary schools (grades k-5), six middle schools (grades 6-8), and four high schools (grades 9-12), the School of Environmental Studies optional high school (grades 11-12), the Area Learning Center alternative high school (grades 9-12) and Dakota Ridge special education school (grades k-12). (School attendance boundary maps and address search)

The district has been honored with six National Blue Ribbon Schools of Excellence awards and numerous state and nationally recognized programs in academics, the arts and athletics.

District 196 is consistently recognized among the nation's top school districts.

District 196 High Schools
All five District 196 high schools compete in the South Suburban Conference of the Minnesota State High School League.

 Apple Valley (Eagles)
 Eagan (Wildcats)
 Eastview (Lightning)
 Rosemount (Irish)
 School of Environmental Studies (Dolphins)

District 196 Middle Schools
 Black Hawk Middle School
 Dakota Hills Middle School
 Falcon Ridge Middle School
 Rosemount Middle School
 Scott Highlands Middle School
 Valley Middle School of STEM

District 196 Elementary Schools

Apple Valley, MN
 Cedar Park Elementary STEM School
 Diamond Path Elementary School of International Studies 
 Greenleaf Elementary School
 Highland Elementary School
 Southview Elementary School
 Westview Elementary School

Burnsville, MN
 Echo Park Elementary - School of Leadership, Engineering and Technology

Eagan, MN
Deerwood Elementary School
Glacier Hills Elementary - School of Arts and Science
Oak Ridge Elementary - School of Leadership, Environmental and Health Sciences 
Pinewood Community School
Red Pine Elementary School
Thomas Lake Elementary School
Woodland Elementary School
Northview Elementary School

Rosemount, MN
 Rosemount Elementary School
 Shannon Park Elementary School

Lakeville, MN
 East Lake Elementary School
 Parkview Elementary School

District 196 Demographics (Revised annually) 
Total population – 145,796 
Total households – 51,181 
60 percent with pre-school and school-age children 
Nearly one-third of all district residents are under the age of 18

See also
List of school districts in Minnesota

References

External links
 Independent School District 196 Website

School districts in Minnesota
Education in Dakota County, Minnesota
Burnsville, Minnesota